Nagri Payeen or Nagri Tarli commonly known as Nagri Payeen (comprising Harikheter and Pathian as two units) is a village in Abbottabad District of Khyber Pakhtunkhwa province of Pakistan.
Famous Points: Barrian (Karlal's House Barian), Bagh, Balyasar, Garlani, Jalsiyan, Hellan, Mohari, Charrat, Katha, Nalla, Kanat, Graan, kathi, Taroli, Upri Pandi.

References 

Populated places in Abbottabad District